Bernhard Bachfisch (born 11 March 1953) is a German weightlifter. He competed in the men's bantamweight event at the 1976 Summer Olympics.

References

External links
 

1953 births
Living people
German male weightlifters
Olympic weightlifters of West Germany
Weightlifters at the 1976 Summer Olympics
Sportspeople from Regensburg